Han Hee-jun (Hangul: 한희준; April 20, 1989) is a Korean singer from Flushing, Queens, New York, who finished in ninth place on the eleventh season of American Idol. He signed with Polaris Entertainment in 2012. In 2013, he finished in the top six of third season of K-pop Star.

Early life
Hee-jun Han was born on April 20, 1989, to Jae-chun and Sun-ae Han in Anyang, Gyeonggi, South Korea. He has an older brother named Hee-seung (Aiden). Hee-jun and his family immigrated to the U.S. when he was 12, moving to Flushing, New York.  He attended Francis Lewis High School.

Before he auditioned for American Idol, he was a non-profit organizer from Milal Mission in New York, a faith-based non-profit in Flushing, working with children with special needs. He has spoken of suffering from emotional depression and credited the children he worked with for helping him recover. He also said the children motivated him to audition for American Idol.

Music career

2012: American Idol, post-Idol and future projects

Han auditioned for the eleventh season of American Idol in Pittsburgh, Pennsylvania with a performance of Michael Bolton's "How Am I Supposed to Live Without You". His audition brought Jennifer Lopez to tears, and Steven Tyler said, "I think you are really great. I think you could be an American Idol". He received a golden ticket to advance to the Hollywood round in Los Angeles.

Han performed the same song for his first solo performance in Hollywood and advanced to the next round. He then formed the group M.I.T. (Most International Team) with Phillip Phillips, Richie Law and Jairon Jackson for the Hollywood group performance. The group had issues during the preparation of its performance, as Law insisted that the performance "do it in his own way" and rejected suggestions from the other members. They performed "Broken Strings" by James Morrison featuring Nelly Furtado and despite a lukewarm reception by the judges, M.I.T. made it to the next round as the judges said it deserved a second chance. Han was put through to the next round again after his second solo performance in Hollywood.

Han went to Las Vegas and performed "I Only Have Eyes for You" by composer Harry Warren and lyricist Al Dubin, with Phillip Phillips, Neco Starr and Jairon Jackson. He was selected for the final Las Vegas round as one of the top 42. In his final Las Vegas performance, he performed "New York State of Mind" by Billy Joel and made the semi-finals as one of the top 25 of the season. During the semi-finals, he performed "Angels" by Robbie Williams to become one of the top five male vote-getters in the semi-finals to advance to the Top 13, thus becoming the first male contestant of East Asian descent to do so. He was the first Korean American to make the finals of American Idol, besting semi-finalists Paul Kim (season 6) and John Park (season 9).

During the Top 13 week, he performed "All in Love Is Fair" by Stevie Wonder. This performance received generally positive feedback from the judges, with Randy Jackson saying, "It wasn't perfect, but it was really good". During the Top 11 week, the remaining contestants had to perform songs released in their birth years. Han chose "Right Here Waiting" by Richard Marx. After hearing Han sing this, Jackson said he felt it wasn't a great performance, but Lopez said she loved the performance by the end of it, though citing Han's vocal issues. As one of the Top 10 contestants of the season, he gained a spot on the show's summer concert tour after the season ended. During the Top 10 week, he performed "My Life" by Billy Joel. The performance was not well received by the judges, with Lopez and Jackson saying Han was entertaining despite vocal issues. Steven Tyler told Han that at some point, he would have to start taking the show seriously. Han landed in the bottom three for that week and was declared safe after Erika Van Pelt was eliminated. During the Top 9 week, he performed Leon Russell's "A Song for You," and received a standing ovation from all the judges after the performance. Lopez said, "That was the most beautiful tone and the most beautiful vibrato," and Jackson added, "Finally, the Hee-jun we selected came back to us tonight." During the results show the following night, Han was found to have received the lowest number of votes, and the judges declined to use their save on him. He thus finished ninth.

Performances/results

 When Ryan Seacrest announced the results for this particular night, Han was among the Bottom 3 but declared safe second, as Erika Van Pelt was eliminated.

Post-Idol
After Idol, Han was on The Tonight Show with Jay Leno, Live! with Kelly and The Wendy Williams Show for interviews and performances with other contestants.  In April 2012, he performed live on KIIS-FM in Los Angeles. He later went on to sing "God Bless America" at a New York Mets game. In May 2012 he performed "The Star-Spangled Banner" at the Asian Pacific American Institute for Congressional Studies Awards Gala.

Han took part in the American Idols LIVE! Tour 2012, which began July 6, 2012 and ran till September 21, 2012. He was featured and was on the cover of the July 2012 issue of Mom and I Family Magazine, a magazine for Korean-American families.

In August 2012, Colton Dixon and Han appeared on The 700 Club and Soulcheck TV, during which they both were interviewed about their Christian faith.

Han performed and appeared as a judge in a K-pop competition at New York University's Skirball Center for the Performing Arts in September 2012. In September 2012, he performed as the opening act for Kim Kyung Ho The concert was at the Orpheum Theatre in Los Angeles.

Later that fall, Han performed at the New Jersey Korean Thanksgiving Festival, and sang "The Star-Spangled Banner" prior to a New York Mets game. In November 2012, he served as a guest judge for the Kollaboration finale in Glendale, California. Han's debut single, "Bring the Love Back", featuring rapper Pusha T, was released on September 17, 2013.

In 2013, he tried out for the third season of K-pop Star and passed the audition. He reached the Top 6 of K-pop Star 3. Since then he has concentrated on his K-pop career and released the single "Q&A" feat. Tiffany from Girls' Generation.

In 2018, he replaced Jae of Day6 as co-host of After School Club.

Discography

Singles

Other charted songs

Filmography

Film

References

External links
 

1989 births
Living people
21st-century American male singers
21st-century American singers
South Korean emigrants to the United States
South Korean pop singers
South Korean rhythm and blues singers
People from Anyang, Gyeonggi
Singers from New York City
K-pop Star participants
American Idol participants
21st-century South Korean male singers
Francis Lewis High School alumni